Loznaya is a rural locality (a selo) and the administrative center of Loznyanskoye Rural Settlement, Rovensky District, Belgorod Oblast, Russia. The population was 948 as of 2010. There are 6 streets.

Geography 
Loznaya is located 13 km northwest of Rovenki (the district's administrative centre) by road. Klinovy is the nearest rural locality.

References 

Rural localities in Rovensky District, Belgorod Oblast